Alberto Frezza (born May 23, 1989) is an Italian-American actor and director.

Early life and education 

Alberto Frezza was born in Milan, Italy, and raised in Addis Ababa, Ethiopia. At 15, he returned to Italy to attend high school.

He graduated from the Acting for Film program at the New York Film Academy.

Career 
In 2008, he made his acting debut in the short film Pills. In 2011, he appeared in the fifth episode of Charlie's Angels, as Wyatt Rice. In 2016, he appeared as Deputy Garrett Sykes in the Freeform drama series Dead of Summer. In 2017, Frezza was cast as a recurring character in the Grey's Anatomy spin-off television series Station 19. He also appeared in The Flight Attendant as Enrico.

Personal life 
Frezza speaks Amharic, and has an older sister. In February 2021, Frezza revealed that he had been diagnosed with cancer. He underwent chemotherapy at the National Tumor Institute in Milan and has since fully recovered. He is a supporter of the Italian football team Juventus.

Filmography

Film

Television

References

External links 
 
 

1989 births
American male film actors
American male television actors
American people of Italian descent
Italian male film actors
Italian male television actors
Italian emigrants to the United States
Male actors from Milan
Male actors from Los Angeles
21st-century American male actors
Living people
People from Addis Ababa
Italian expatriates in Ethiopia